János Bagócs (born 2 February 1945) is a Hungarian weightlifter. He competed in the men's lightweight event at the 1968 Summer Olympics.

References

External links
 

1945 births
Living people
Hungarian male weightlifters
Olympic weightlifters of Hungary
Weightlifters at the 1968 Summer Olympics
Sportspeople from Pest County